Leoš Friedl and Dušan Vemić were the defending champions, but decided not to participate.

Carsten Ball and Andre Begemann won the title, defeating Grégoire Burquier and Yannick Mertens 6–2, 6–4 in the final.

Seeds

Draw

Draw

References
 Main Draw

American Express - TED Open - Doubles
PTT İstanbul Cup